Bloodsuckers is the third studio album by Japanese rock band Vamps, released on October 29, 2014. The album reached number 5 on the Oricon chart. Its release followed in Europe on March 23, 2015, and in the United States on March 24. The album's production was done by Josh Wilbur collaborating with Vamps, and the cover artwork was designed by Japanese artist Rockin’ Jelly Bean.

'Ahead' was titled 'World's End' for international release and was used in the Sony campaign for the Xperia UK mobile. While ‘Vampire’s Love’ was used as the theme song for the Japanese release of the 2014 feature film Dracula Untold.

Additionally, ‘The Jolly Roger’ was featured in the TV commercial for Nissan’s X-Trail SUV.

Track listing

References 

2014 albums
Vamps (band) albums